Timothy Richard "Tiff" Needell (born 29 October 1951 in Havant, Hampshire) is a British racing driver and television presenter. He is a presenter of Lovecars, and formerly served as co-presenter of Top Gear and Fifth Gear.

Biography
Needell attended Ottershaw School followed by City University, London where he achieved an Honours Degree in Civil Engineering. Hired by George Wimpey & Co, his day job was as a Structural Design Engineer.

Racing career
Needell first raced at a driving school at Brands Hatch in 1970. He progressed to Formula Ford, his progress assisted by the use of a Lotus 69 FF he won in an Autosport magazine competition. He later sold his Lotus and used the money to buy and race an Elden Mk10. Needell's Formula Ford period culminated in his acquiring a Crosslé 25F with which he won the Kent Messenger FF Championship after competing for only half of the remaining season. This success landed him a partly paid drive in the Formula Ford 2000 Championship in a Hawke chassis provided by McKinstry Racing. Needell was completely dominant in that car and series which provided him with the springboard into Formula 3. The remainder of the 1970s saw Needell as a front-runner in the British Formula 3 series and then in the Aurora British Formula One championship. However, he had an engine problem and did not finish the race. He subsequently failed to qualify for the Monaco Grand Prix.

In 1988 and 1989 he competed in the British Rallycross Grand Prix in a Metro 6R4 prepared by Will Gollop's motorsport team. He achieved a good result in 1988 finishing 4th in the B-Final in what was his first rallycross event, however, the 1989 event was cancelled due to heavy fog after the practice sessions.

Needell made his first appearance at the 24 Hours of Le Mans in 1981 driving an Ibec-Hesketh 308LM alongside Tony Trimmer. They failed to finish and again in 1982 this time paired with Bob Evans and Geoff Lees in an Aston Martin Nimrod NRA/C2. However the following year Needell finished 17th driving a Porsche 956. In 1985 Needell briefly led the 24 hours driving the Aston Martin EMKA C84/1 and would eventually finish 11th.

He then had a couple of years in the British Touring Car Championship with Nissan, before returning to sports cars in 1995, driving a Porsche at Daytona and a Jaguar XJ220 at Le Mans.

He then drove the Lister Storm for five years, reaching third overall at Daytona in 1997 before gearbox problems dropped them to nineteenth. In 1998 he finished fifth in the British GT Championship and won the Silverstone Golden Jubilee Trophy race. That same year, he was to be part of Lister's assault on Le Mans, but the car failed scrutineering and thus didn't qualify. In 2000, he again drove for Lister, this time in three races of the British GT Championship, winning all of them. He won at Donington Park in the main Lister entry and then competed in two further rounds in the CSi privately entered Lister. Due to the late entry, this car wasn't registered for championship points, but Tiff won both races at Circuit de Spa-Francorchamps and Silverstone Circuit. He also took part in the 2000 FIA GT Championship for one round at Zolder.

Since then, Needell's racing career has mainly consisted of racing closed-wheel cars, with varying levels of success in sports cars, historic racing and touring cars. He achieved particular notoriety after an accident with Nigel Mansell at the 1993 TOCA shoot out race at Donington Park.

Television career
Needell is a television presenter and motoring journalist and co-hosted the original run of the BBC TV series Top Gear starting in 1987. In 2001, when the BBC cancelled Top Gear (the show was revived in 2002 under a new format), Needell and the whole cast defected and signed with Channel 5 to produce and host a new motoring show named Fifth Gear. Needell has also co-presented 'MPH' at Earls Court in 2003, 2004 and 2005 with Jeremy Clarkson and Richard Hammond and in 2006 with Clarkson and James May (because Hammond was recovering from an on-location accident in a rocket car which rolled over at top speed, leaving him in a coma). He also appeared very briefly in the 2005 Top Gear Comic Relief special, "Stars in Fast Cars". In 2009, he appeared on James May's Toy Stories featuring the building of a Scalextric around Brooklands, and also visited James May's Lego house. In 2011, he appeared on Top Gear, driving the Ariel Atom V8 in a race against a BMW S1000RR around the Top Gear Test Track. The segment was done in humour, with May supposedly driving the Atom V8, only for it to actually be Needell.

He was one of several people suspected of portraying the elusive masked racing driver The Stig on the current format of Top Gear. The true identity of The Stig was eventually revealed as being Ben Collins late in production, necessitating Needell's return to Top Gear after a nine-year absence to train director Danny Boyle for his lap in the "Star In A Reasonably Priced Car" segment. In the same episode Clarkson referred to Needell as the "Emergency Stig".

On 22 September 2013, Needell co-starred in Tommy Kendall's Fox Sports 1 show, Driven - A Race Without Boundaries.

In 2016, Needell announced that Fifth Gear had ended.
In 2018, Needell and others announced a new series of Fifth Gear was being filmed and will be shown on Quest in September of the same year; however, the 2019 series no longer features Needell in their presenter line-up.

In 2020, Needell featured on a new TV show Lovecars: On The Road, which originated from the Lovecars YouTube channel where Needell travels Europe with his co-presenter Paul Woodman to try out no fewer than 50 cars.

Other work
On 7 February 1999, Needell drove a McLaren F1 XP5 prototype to set the fastest lap record at the Millbrook Proving Ground in Bedfordshire, over a 2-mile (3.2 km) banked circuit, top speed test: An average speed of 195.3 mph (314.3 km/h) was attained, with a maximum speed of 200.8 mph (323.2 km/h).

In 2018 Needell started as a presenter with Lovecars. mainly for their car reviews on YouTube. together with co-host Paul Woodman. Notable reviews include the world's first Tesla race car, together with an ongoing series of Tiff Talks, where regular motoring news is discussed.

He writes for the magazine Modern Classic, together with a regular motor racing news feature on Drive Tribe.

Needell has lent his voice to the first and second games in the TOCA Touring Car series for British video game developer Codemasters. His voice is also featured in the Ferrari Challenge and Le Mans 24 Hours video game for racing game developer Eutechnyx. He also features in the video games Race Pro and GTR Evolution racing an Aston Martin DBR9. Additionally, he is the voice of the Road Angel road safety device and GPS speed camera alert system, as well as the face on their advertising campaigns. He was the launching announcer for the high speed Rita roller coaster at Alton Towers, as well as narrating several Discovery Channel documentaries.

Thruxton Circuit has an exclusive deal which enables customers to pay £150 for three laps of fast-paced driving and drifting with Needell. The laps are filmed from within the car and feature his commentary and conversation with the passenger.

Needell has also presented the world series of Powerboat racing throughout the United Kingdom. Working with Greenlight TV and Powerboat GP, Needell regularly commentates, casts voice-overs and interviews drivers. His latest appearance during the world championship race in Nottingham on 1 September 2013 saw the climatic result of the Powerboat F2 Series come to a thrilling end.

Personal life
He lives in Wiltshire with his wife Patsy and his three sons, Jack, Harry and George. His younger brother Chris is a team manager for Barwell Motorsports team who currently race the Lamborghini Huracan GT3.

In November 2006, Needell was cleared of 'failing to supply details in relation to a speeding ticket', and the accompanying speeding offence by Pontypridd magistrates. He was defended by Nick Freeman, otherwise known as Mr. Loophole, who also defended former colleague Jeremy Clarkson on a similar case.

He is a football fan and supports Southampton. He is also an active user of Twitter.

He also works as an after-dinner speaker.

Racing record

Complete Formula One results
(key)

24 Hours of Le Mans results

Complete European Touring Car Championship results

(key) (Races in bold indicate pole position) (Races in italics indicate fastest lap)

Complete World Touring Car Championship results
(key) (Races in bold indicate pole position; races in italics indicate fastest lap)

Complete British Touring Car Championship results
(key) (Races in bold indicate pole position - 1 point awarded) (Races in italics indicate fastest lap)

† Not eligible for points.

‡ Endurance driver.

Complete British GT Championship results
(key) (Races in bold indicate pole position) (Races in italics indicate fastest lap)

† Not eligible for points.

References

External links

interview on Mitzi TV, "Baby You Can Drive My Car" 

1951 births
Living people
English racing drivers
English Formula One drivers
Ensign Formula One drivers
British Touring Car Championship drivers
Drifting drivers
D1 Grand Prix drivers
British Formula Three Championship drivers
British Formula One Championship drivers
British GT Championship drivers
Alumni of City, University of London
People from Havant
24 Hours of Le Mans drivers
World Sportscar Championship drivers
24 Hours of Spa drivers
Top Gear people
Porsche Carrera Cup GB drivers
ASCAR drivers
BMW M drivers
TOM'S drivers
Ecurie Ecosse drivers
Team Joest drivers
Škoda Motorsport drivers
Lamborghini Super Trofeo drivers